Helena is a Brazilian graphic novel by Studio Seasons (PT), a Brazilian manga influenced comic book creators consisting of Simone Beatriz, Sylvia Feer, and Montserrat. Published by NewPOP (PT), is based on Helena, a novel by Machado de Assis.

Characters
 Helena
 Estácio
 Eugênia
 Doctor Camargo
 D. Úrsula
 Luís Mendonça
 Father Melchior

References

External links
  Official website by Studio Seasons
  Official website at NewPop

Brazilian graphic novels